William Augusto Alves Conserva (born 29 April 1987), known as William Alves, is a Brazilian footballer who plays as a central defender for Santa Cruz.

Career
William Alves played for South China of Hong Kong in the Hong Kong First Division League. Steven Lo thought he is young and speedy and will help to shore up South China's defence. However, in December 2010, Steven Lo said that Alves' contract would be terminated.

References

External links

1987 births
Living people
Brazilian footballers
Association football defenders
Campeonato Brasileiro Série A players
Campeonato Brasileiro Série B players
Campeonato Brasileiro Série C players
Joinville Esporte Clube players
Clube Esportivo Bento Gonçalves players
Sport Club Corinthians Paulista players
Mogi Mirim Esporte Clube players
Esporte Clube Juventude players
Rio Claro Futebol Clube players
Rio Branco Sport Club players
Paysandu Sport Club players
Santa Cruz Futebol Clube players
Clube Náutico Capibaribe players
Atlético Clube Goianiense players
Hong Kong First Division League players
South China AA players
Primeira Liga players
C.D. Feirense players
Vitória F.C. players
Saudi Professional League players
Al Batin FC players
Mirassol Futebol Clube players
Brazilian expatriate footballers
Brazilian expatriate sportspeople in Portugal
Brazilian expatriate sportspeople in Hong Kong
Brazilian expatriate sportspeople in Saudi Arabia
Expatriate footballers in Portugal
Expatriate footballers in Hong Kong
Expatriate footballers in Saudi Arabia